Jan Durka (10 March 1903 – 17 March 1958) was a Polish footballer. He played in one match for the Poland national football team in 1926.

References

External links
 

1903 births
1958 deaths
Polish footballers
Poland international footballers
Place of birth missing
Association football forwards
ŁKS Łódź players